The Elizabeth Ann Classic was a women's professional golf tournament on the Ladies European Tour held in England. It was played in 1980 and 1981 at Pannal Golf Club, in Pannal near Harrogate, North Yorkshire.

Winners

Source:

References

External links
Ladies European Tour

Former Ladies European Tour events
Golf tournaments in England
Defunct sports competitions in England
Recurring sporting events established in 1980
Recurring sporting events disestablished in 1981